The rules of civil procedure in Australia govern procedure in the various courts and tribunals in Australia. Civil procedure in Australia was historically derived from, and continues to resemble, civil procedure in England and Wales. The rules vary between the different courts and tribunals.

History
Before Federation, each Australian colony had a two- or three-tiered judicial system with a Supreme Court at its apex. The colonial Supreme Courts followed the model of the Supreme Court of Judicature of England and Wales, as the High Court of Justice was known from the 1870s, when it was established by the Judicature Acts. Civil procedure in the colonial Supreme Courts was governed by rules made by the judges and known as the Rules of the Supreme Court, some of which continue in force today.

Legislation
Most states have now codified the rules of civil procedure as delegated legislation, sometimes known as Uniform Civil Procedure Rules. The Chief Justice of the relevant Supreme Court is generally the chair of a rules committee with the power to amend the rules. However, the title and structure of the relevant civil procedure rules is not uniform across jurisdictions.

In Queensland, the rules were intended to be "uniform, so far as practicable, for all three courts in the State stream" – that is, to unify the procedure of the Supreme, District and Magistrates Court, not participate in a cooperative federalism effort like the Uniform Evidence Acts.

The following legislation governs civil procedure in each jurisdiction.

Commonwealth

New South Wales

Queensland
 

 
 Uniform Civil Procedure Rules 1999 (Qld)

South Australia
 
 Uniform Civil Rules 2020 (SA)

Tasmania

Victoria

Western Australia

Australian Capital Territory

Northern Territory

Commentary
Civil procedure is one of the Priestley 11 subjects which all Australian lawyers are required to study. There are a number of textbooks available, as well as regularly-updated commentaries for legal professionals.

See also
 Civil procedure
 Judiciary of Australia
 Primary and secondary legislation
 Lawsuit
 Summons
 Subpoena
 Interlocutory injunction
 Summary judgment
 Judgment (law)

References

Law of Australia